Siegel is an unincorporated community in Baytown Township, Washington County, Minnesota, United States.  The community is located south of Oak Park Heights near the junction of Washington County Roads 14 and 24.

Nearby places include Oak Park Heights, Bayport, and Stillwater.

Siegel is located within section 9 of Baytown Township.

References

Unincorporated communities in Minnesota
Unincorporated communities in Washington County, Minnesota